Henri Nallet (born 6 January 1939 in Bergerac, Dordogne) is a French politician. He is a member of the Socialist Party.

He was twice Minister of Agriculture between 1985 and 1986, and between 1988 and 1990. He also was the Minister of Justice between 1990 and 1992.

References

1939 births
Living people
People from Bergerac, Dordogne
Politicians from Nouvelle-Aquitaine
Socialist Party (France) politicians
French Ministers of Agriculture
French Ministers of Justice
Deputies of the 8th National Assembly of the French Fifth Republic
Deputies of the 9th National Assembly of the French Fifth Republic
Deputies of the 11th National Assembly of the French Fifth Republic